Muhammad Khairulhin bin Mohd Khalid (born 18 July 1991) is a Singaporean footballer who plays as a goalkeeper for Hougang United in the S.League.

Youth career 
Khairulhin was part of the National Youth Academy age group set ups until he was 18.

Club career

LionsXII 
In December 2011, the Football Association of Singapore announced that Khairulhin will join the newly formed LionsXII in the 2012 Malaysia Super League. The news was a shocking one as Khairulhin had been out of footballing circles for the past 3 years. He, however, failed to make a single appearance with first-choice Izwan Mahbud and back-up goalkeeper Hyrulnizam Juma'at ahead of him.

With the departure of Hyrulnizam to Warriors, Khairulhin assumed the role of second-choice custodian behind Izwan. He made his debut as a substitute against T-Team on 11 May 2013.

In total, Khairulhin made less than 10 appearances for LionsXII from 2012 to 2015.

Hougang United 
Following the exit of the LionsXII from the Malaysia Super League, Khairulhin signed for Hougang United for the 2016 S.League season following the advice of former head coach and Singapore legend Fandi Ahmad. He started the season as the first choice goalkeeper for the Cheetahs, keeping 2 clean sheets in his first 3 games. After 12 games, Khairulhin had kept 4 clean sheets, more than any other local custodians in the league. He made 22 appearances in total over the entire season and was retained for the 2017 S.League season.

Khairulhin retained his position as starting goalkeeper for the Cheetahs, conceding only 16 goals in 14 S.League games.

International career

Khairulhin was part of the Singapore national under-23 football team that won the bronze medal at the 2013 Southeast Asian Games.

Senior Team
Following his exploits early on in the 2016 S.league season, Khairulhin was called up by national coach Bernd Stange for centralised training. Khairulhin was called up for the training tour in Japan and the friendly against Cambodia in 2016 by coach V. Sundramoorthy.

Career statistics

Club

 Young Lions and LionsXII are ineligible for qualification to AFC competitions in their respective leagues.

Honours

Club
LionsXII
 Malaysia Super League: 2013

International
Singapore
 Southeast Asian Games: Bronze Medal – 2013

References

1991 births
Living people
Singaporean footballers
Association football goalkeepers
Hougang United FC players
Singapore Premier League players
Singaporean people of Malay descent
Singapore international footballers
Southeast Asian Games bronze medalists for Singapore
Southeast Asian Games medalists in football
Competitors at the 2013 Southeast Asian Games